Nuxeo is a software company making an open source content management system.

Corporate history
Nuxeo was founded in the year 2000 by Stefane Fermigier. Eric Barroca became the CEO and Director of the management Board in December 2008. Sometime around 2005, Nuxeo went through a technology re-architecture and developed a base content management framework on the Java environment. The digital asset management product was officially launched in February 2010, although it went into public beta in December 2009, and since then it has found a wide base of interest both in Europe and North America.

Nuxeo Content Platform 
Nuxeo Content Platform is an open source Enterprise Content Management platform, written in Java. Data can be stored in both SQL & NoSQL databases.

The development of the Nuxeo Content Platform is mostly done by Nuxeo employees with an open development model.

The source code, documentation, roadmap, issue tracker, testing, benchmarks are all public.

Applications 
Typically, Nuxeo users build different types of information management for document management, case management, and digital asset management use cases. It uses schema-flexible metadata & content models that allows content to be repurposed to fulfill future use cases.

Architecture 
Nuxeo Content Platform is a set of server-side and client-side software artifacts and tools that allow users to build, operate and maintain customized content management applications. The platform is composed of several layers:

 Nuxeo Runtime: The underlying component model that is used to declare, configure, test and activate services
 Nuxeo Core: The document repository providing schema management, CRUD, indexing & query. Implementation can rely on SQL or NoSQL depending on the use cases.
 Nuxeo Services: A set of document-related services that can be added on top of Nuxeo Core
 Workflows, annotations, conversions, renditions...
 Client Libs: Client-side libraries encapsulating the server REST API
 Java, JavaScript, Python, C#, PHP...
 Client SDKs: UI components and pre-built UI for various platforms
 Nuxeo Elements for Web Components and WebUI
 Nuxeo Mobile for mobile devices
 Nuxeo Drive for filesystem synchronization

The Nuxeo Content Platform is based on a configurable and extendable component model.

Using an open source development model, Nuxeo provides a subscription program with software maintenance, technical support, and customization tools. Nuxeo Content Platform can be deployed on-premises or in the cloud via services like Nuxeo Studio to deliver cloud content management services.

Performance 
Nuxeo Benchmarks are available.

Product history 
2006:

 CPS becomes Nuxeo Platform:
 full rebuild from Python/Zope to Java/JEE
 Use of Apache JackRabbit as the main storage backend

2008:

 Eric Barroca became the CEO and Director of the Management Board
 Series A Funding: $2.6 million from OTC Asset Management
 Native SQL Storage and REST API
 clean and scalable SQL backend with Visual Content Store
 introduces WebEngine (JAX-RS + Freemarker)

2009:

 Distributions: 3 distributions of the platform are created: Document Management, Digital Asset Management, and Case Management

2010:

 Series A Funding: $3.3 million from OTC Asset Management
 Introduces Nuxeo Studio: a graphical interface where users can define business objects, types of content, workflows, taxonomy, and user experience. This is the first version of the online configuration IDE (Nuxeo Studio)
 Nuxeo deploys the Nuxeo Marketplace to share Nuxeo Platform add-ons
 Introduces CMIS compliance

2011:

 Introduces Nuxeo Cloud 1.0
 Host Nuxeo on AWS leveraging S3 and RDS
 Native Mobile SDKs for iOS and Android

2012:

 Enters the US market
 Introduces Content Routing: a new workflow engine based on Nuxeo technologies

2013:

 Series A Funding: $3.8 million from OTC Asset Management & OTC Extend
 Introduces the Nuxeo Mobile App
 Introduces Nuxeo Drive to handle local file system replication
 REST API for Document access
 Integrate Redis

2014:

 Moves Headquarters to New York, NY
 Integrates NoSQL technologies: MongoDB
 Introduces Nuxeo.io: An on-demand container-based hosting

2015:

 Integrates NoSQL technologies: Elasticsearch

2016:

 New funding of $30 Million from Goldman Sachs & Kennett Partners
 Acquisition of Inevo
 UI migrates to WebComponents

2017:

 Launches Nuxeo Content Cloud: a new version of the Nuxeo Cloud offering and a ReactNative mobile application
 Enters the Gartner Magic Quadrant for Content Services Platforms

2018:

 Enters the Forrester Wave for Digital Asset Management
 Opens offices in Tokyo, Japan
 CAAS and AI
 Production-grade deployments on K8S and Openshift
 Integrates AI services

See also

 Comparison of content management systems
 List of collaborative software

References

Document management systems
Free content management systems
Java platform software